The Kinsman Range, also known as the Cannon–Kinsman Range, is a north–south range in the White Mountains of New Hampshire in the United States. Its highest point is  Kinsman Mountain, followed by the  North Peak of Kinsman, and  Cannon Mountain, one of the richest in rock climbing routes in the Whites. All are official "Four-thousand footers".  Mount Wolf is on the crest of the range south of Kinsman Mountain. Rounding out the range are  Bald Peak on the west side of Kinsman Mountain and  Mount Pemigewasset on the east side, overlooking Franconia Notch.

To the northeast, the range is connected by The Cannon Balls ridge to Cannon Mountain. The southwest end of the range is at Kinsman Notch, a  mountain pass and westernmost of the White Mountains' four major notches. The  Kinsman Ridge Trail traverses the entire range from Kinsman Notch to the north base of Cannon Mountain in Franconia Notch. The Appalachian Trail follows the Kinsman Ridge Trail from Kinsman Notch to just north of the North Peak of Kinsman, where it turns east to Lonesome Lake before descending into the southern end of Franconia Notch.

The range is in Grafton County, near the town of Lincoln. Its west side drains into Long Island Sound via the Gale River, Ammonoosuc River, and Connecticut River, the east into the Gulf of Maine via the Pemigewasset River and Merrimack River.

See also
 List of mountains of New Hampshire
 White Mountain National Forest

References

External links 
 PeakBagger.com: Kinsman Range

Mountain ranges of New Hampshire
White Mountains (New Hampshire)
White Mountain National Forest
Landforms of Grafton County, New Hampshire